The 2019 Philippine general election was conducted on May 13, 2019. A midterm election, those elected therein will take office on June 30, 2019, midway through the term of President Rodrigo Duterte.

The following positions were contested:
12 seats in the Senate of the Philippines
All seats in the House of Representatives of the Philippines
All governors, vice governors and regular members of the Sangguniang Panlalawigan (Provincial Councils) in the provinces of the Philippines
All mayors, vice mayors and regular members of the Sangguniang Panlungsod (City Councils) or Sangguniang Bayan (Municipal Councils) in the cities or municipalities of the Philippines

Under the Local Government Code and the 1987 constitution, all terms start on June 30, 2019, and end on June 30, 2022, except for elected senators, whose terms shall end on June 30, 2025. The Commission on Elections administered the election.

Preparation

Date of the election
The 1987 Constitution of the Philippines states that unless otherwise provided by law, the election of members of Congress is on every second Monday of May. According to Republic Act No. 7166, election for national, provincial, city and municipal elections are on the second Monday of May, since 1992, and every three years thereafter, with the president and vice president being elected in six-year intervals. It has been three years since the last general election of 2016, and with no law canceling the election, this meant that the election was held on Monday, May 13, 2019.

The commission confirmed the day of the election day of May 13 when it released the calendar for the election. The important days are:
Filing of candidacies and nominations for party-list representatives: October 11 to 12, and October 15 to 17, 2018
Campaign period
For Senate and party-list elections: February 12 to May 11, 2019
For district congressional and local elections: March 29 to May 11, 2019
Substitution of candidates: November 30 to 12:00 p.m. of May 13, 2019
Election silence: April 18 to 19 and May 12 to 13, 2019
Election day: May 13, 2019
Deadline of filing of expenses: June 12, 2019

Automated election system 

The Philippines adopted an automated election system (AES) for the 2019 elections. The COMELEC announced in December 2018 that the Philippine AES passed the review conducted by international systems and software testing firm, Pro V&V, in Alabama, USA.

The Commission had a 'trusted build' program wherein the program to be used in the midterms in 2019 is built using the reviewed components. Commissioner Marlon Casquejo on December 17, 2018 turned over the executable file of the Election Management System (EMS) Trusted Build for the May 13, 2019 National and Local Elections (NLE) to the Commission en banc. The file will be escrowed to the Bangko Sentral ng Pilipinas.

The EMS compiled the number and profile of registered voters, their geographic locations and polling precinct information, and these were used in designing the official ballots.

Equipment
The Commission on Elections made a decision on February 1, 2018 to purchase vote-counting machines (VCM), which were used in the 2016 presidential election for a price of 2.122 billion pesos for the 2019 mid-term elections.

Commission on Elections membership
On October 17, 2017, the House of Representatives impeached Commission on Elections Chairman Andres D. Bautista due to allegations of manipulation of the 2016 vice presidential election in favor of Leni Robredo. Hours earlier, Bautista announced his resignation effective December 31. President Duterte accepted Bautista's resignation effective immediately, on October 23. Duterte then appointed Sheriff Abas as new chairman, in November 2017.

The Commission on Appointments confirmed Duterte's appointment of Abas as chairman in May 2018. Abas was expected to head the commission on the 2019 elections. At the confirmation hearing, Abas defended the commission's purchase of the vote-counting machines, saying that they were purchased at one-third of the cost. The commission later confirmed Duterte's appointment of Socorro Inting as commissioner later that month. Duterte also appointed Marlon S. Casquejo as commissioner on June and Undersecretary of Justice Antonio Kho as commissioner on July, completing the commission's seven seats.

Proposed cancellation
Due to the drive to change the constitution to make the Philippines a federation, Speaker of the House of Representatives Pantaleon Alvarez said in January 2018 that the cancellation of the 2019 elections was possible, as a transition government would be needed. Later, Duterte ruled out the cancellation the election.

By July, after the consultative committee submitted their draft constitution to Duterte and Congress, Alvarez proposed to cancel the 2019 elections so that Congress could concentrate on revising the constitution. Senate President Tito Sotto said that this was possible by Congress passing a law for the cancellation of the election. Members of the consultative committee, on the other hand, preferred holding the election. Aquilino Pimentel Jr. said that "I suggest elections will continue (because people suspect that) we are proposing federalism so that the elections can be postponed. It is not true, not at all."

Later that month, Senator Panfilo Lacson said that most senators, including those who were running for reelection, would have blocked any moves by the lower house to cancel the election. This came as Alvarez switched his preferred mode of amending the constitution via a People's Initiative. Senator Franklin Drilon earlier stated that the minority bloc would have sued if Alvarez's plan of cancelling the election pushed through.

With the ouster of Alvarez by Gloria Macapagal Arroyo as speaker in July 2018, the latter said that she preferred the elections pushing through.

Results

Congress
The 18th Congress of the Philippines comprises the winners of this election, together with the winning candidates in the 2016 Senate election.

Senate

Twelve seats in the Senate, or those seats that were first disputed in 1995, and were last up in 2013, were up for election.

The Hugpong ng Pagbabago, the alliance backed by Davao City mayor and presidential daughter Sara Duterte won nine of the seats up. The primary opposition coalition, Otso Diretso, failed to win any seats. Candidates from neither alliance won the other three seats.

House of Representatives

All seats in the House of Representatives were up for election.

Parties associated with the current administration, such as PDP–Laban, the Nacionalista Party, National Unity Party and Partido Federal ng Pilipinas won a majority of the seats contested. Other allies of the Duterte administration, such as the Nationalist People's Coalition, Lakas–CMD and various local parties, also won many seats. The Liberal Party won 18 seats, and is to form the nucleus of the minority bloc.

Congressional district elections

Party-list election
Pro-administration ACT-CIS Partylist topped the party-list election, winning the maximum three seats. The leftist opposition Bayan Muna also won the maximum three seats. Other members of the Party-List Coalition won most of the other seats. Some consistent winners in past party-list elections noticeably failed to win seats, such as Akbayan, Anakpawis and Butil Farmers Party.

Local

All totals as of the first quarter of 2018:
 All 81 provincial governors and vice governors, and all regular members of all of the Sangguniang Panlalawigan were up for election.
 All 145 city mayors and vice mayors, and all regular members of all of the Sangguniang Panlungsod were up for election.
 All 1,489 municipal mayors and vice mayors, and all regular members of all of the Sangguniang Bayan were up for election.

The ex officio members of the local legislatures, who have been elected after the 2018 barangay and Sangguniang Kabataan elections, shall serve until January 1, 2023, after the barangay elections in May 2020 were postponed to December 2022.

Changes are as compared to the 2016 local elections.

Provincial-level

City- and municipal-level

Glitches 
On May 13, the number of malfunctioned vote counting machines (VCMs) tripled compared to the 2016 election. According to COMELEC spokesperson James Jimenez, 400–600 out of 85,000 VCMs across the country (representing 0.7%) encountered glitches. The machines were from the 2016 elections, and the COMELEC admitted that it could be because the machines are not new.

Faulty SD cards were also reported to be the cause of malfunction. The substandard ballot forms as well as markers that bleed ink are other causes of malfunction and anomalies. The COMELEC will probe the suppliers: Triplex Enterprises Incorporated for the ballot paper and marking pens and S1 Technologies Incorporated and Silicon Valley Computer Group joint venture for the SD cards.

Jimenez, however, said that the problems experienced were still within range of expected range of expectation, as problematic machines account for only less than 1 percent of total machines used.

There are reports of running out of ballots in a polling precinct in Alburquerque, Bohol; affected voters have waited for two hours before the extra ballots was delivered at 3pm. At around 10, the COMELEC has experienced problems with the transparency server where the unofficial tally has been stuck for hours, with only 0.38% of polling precincts have managed to transmit the results. But experts agree that the glitches don't necessarily mean cheating took place. The transmission happened, according to PPCRV Chairperson Myla Villanueva. In an interview, Villanueva said that 'results were receiver by transparency server continuously, despite media temporarily not being able to see the results.' She added that 'most importantly, the ERs match with transmitted results.' 

Despite the glitches, the random manual audits (RMA) conducted days after the elections show that the 2019 midterms yielded the highest rate of accuracy among the previous automated elections. Based on the 2019 RMA, the accuracy rate for the senatorial votes was at 99.9971 percent; for members of the House 99.9946 percent; and 99.9941 percent for mayor.

The COMELEC recorded at least 20 people have been killed in an election-related incidents and 43 incidents during the course of election campaign as of May 13, most notably the killing of AKO Bicol congressman Rodel Batocabe on December 22, 2018. There are reported violence during the election day: a shooting occurred at the polling center in Panglima Estino, Sulu where six have been injured.

Reaction 
In a Pulse Asia opinion poll dated June 24–30, 2019, 82% of those surveyed found the election to be believable while 82% said the release of the results were fast. Meanwhile, 10% of respondents found their names missing in the voters list, 4% of their registration was deactivated, 1% of the vote counting machine malfunctioned, as the issues in the election.

References

 
2019 elections in the Philippines
May 2019 events in the Philippines
General elections in the Philippines